Angus MacLane (born April 13, 1975) is an American animator, storyboard artist, character designer, screenwriter, film director, and voice actor currently working at Pixar. He co-directed the film Finding Dory (2016) and made his solo feature directorial debut with the Toy Story spin-off film Lightyear (2022). MacLane is also a Lego enthusiast and created the CubeDudes building format and designed a LEGO WALL-E that has become an official set from The Lego Group.

Early life and career
Angus MacLane was born on April 13, 1975 in Riverside County, California but grew up in Portland, Oregon. He originally wanted to be a comic book artist but halfway through school switched to animation and hoped one day he could work at the Will Vinton Studios (now Laika) and would eventually go on to work for the studio before working for Pixar. In 1997, he received a bachelor of fine arts from Rhode Island School of Design.

MacLane joined Pixar in 1997, starting as an animator on Geri's Game.

He worked as an animator on every Pixar feature film from A Bug's Life through Toy Story 3. He also worked in the character development on Monsters, Inc. and The Incredibles.

His work on The Incredibles gained him an Annie for Outstanding Achievement in Character Animation.  After serving as Supervising Animator on One Man Band, MacLane started working on the story team for Andrew Stanton's WALL-E and later moved up to Directing Animator. After animating a small scene for a side character named BURN-E, MacLane wanted to know what might happen to the character. He originally wanted BURN-E's story arc part of the actual film, but Stanton ended up wanting him to develop it into a short which eventually became BURN-E, which can now be viewed on the DVD and Blu-ray releases of WALL-E. For a short amount of time, he worked on the animation for Up, and the animation on Toy Story 3.

After BURN-E, MacLane started to move further to directing and writing works in the studio with the Toy Story Toon: Small Fry and Pixar's first TV special Toy Story of Terror!, for which he won an Annie for Outstanding Achievement in Directing in an Animated TV/Broadcast Production. In addition, MacLane co-directed Pixar's 2016 film Finding Dory and directed the 2022 film Lightyear.

Filmography

Feature films

Short films

Television

Disney+ Original Specials 
{| class="wikitable"
|-
! Year
! Title
! Role
|-
| 2021
| Pixar 2021 Disney+ Day Special
| rowspan="2"| Himself
|-
| 2022
| Beyond Infinity: Buzz and the Journey to 'Lightyear'''
|}

Recognition
 2005, Won Annie Award for 'Character Animation' for The Incredibles 2014, Won Annie Award for 'Outstanding Achievement in Directing ' for Toy Story of Terror''

References

External links

1975 births
Living people
American animated film directors
American male voice actors
American storyboard artists
Annie Award winners
Film directors from Oregon
Male actors from Portland, Oregon
Pixar people
Place of birth missing (living people)
Writers from Portland, Oregon